Pinewood Halt railway station was a station on the Didcot, Newbury and Southampton Railway in England. It served the northern parts of Hermitage and Oare both in Berkshire. The halt was opened on 11 September 1933 in the hope of increasing passenger traffic. It closed in 1962.

Facilities
There was a single platform and shelter but an additional platform, also with a shelter, was later built with the addition of a passing loop. The station itself had no goods facilities, but a couple of sidings were built to the north east of the station to serve the brickworks near the site.

The site today
Evidence of the trackwork for the brickworks sidings can still be seen, although these had been built privately and they predated the halt.

Services

References 

Disused railway stations in Berkshire
Former Great Western Railway stations
Railway stations in Great Britain opened in 1933
Railway stations in Great Britain closed in 1942
Railway stations in Great Britain opened in 1943
Railway stations in Great Britain closed in 1962